Rani Karnavati also known as Rani Karmavati (died 8 March 1534), was a princess and temporary ruler from Bundi, India.  She was married to Rana Sanga (c.1508-1528) of Mewar. She was the mother of the next two Ranas, Rana Vikramaditya and Rana Udai Singh, and grandmother of Maharana Pratap. She served as regent during the minority of her son, from 1527 until 1533. She was as fierce as her husband and defended Chittor with a small contingent of soldiers until it inevitably fell to the Gujarat army which was led by Bahadur Shah of Gujarat.  She refused to flee and performed Jauhar to protect her honour.

Biography

After Babur had captured the throne of Delhi in 1526 AD, Rana Sangram Singh or Rana Sanga of Mewar lead a confederation of Rajput Kings against Babur to capture the throne of Delhi. Initially the Rana succeeded in pushing the Mughal army back in the Battle of Bayana. But in Battle of Khanua, he was defeated due to Babur's superior tactics, cannons and artillery. 

Rani Karnavati took up the regency in the name of her elder son Vikramaditya, a weak ruler. In the meantime, Mewar was attacked for the second time by Bahadur Shah of Gujarat, at whose hands Vikramaditya had earlier received a defeat. It was a matter of great concern for Rani.

The antagonized nobles were not ready to fight for Vikramaditya and the imminent battle was sure to be another blot in the history of Sisodias. Rani Karnavati wrote to the nobles to come forward for the sake of the honour of the Sisodias, and was able to persuade the nobles to fight for Mewar, if not for Vikramaditya. Their sole condition was that Vikramaditya and Uday Singh should go to Bundi during the war for their personal safety. Some later unsophisticated legends say that the Rani also sent a Rakhi to the Mughal Emperor Humayun, calling him a brother and asking for help. Thus her name became irrevocably linked to the festival of Raksha Bandhan. However this is not supported by any contemporary writer and modern historians like Satish Chandra consider this to be a fable rather than a historical fact.

Rani Karnavati agreed to send her sons to Bundi and told her trusted maid Panna Dai to accompany them and take good care of them. Panna was reluctant, but surrendered to the wishes of the queen. The Sisodias had fought valiantly, but they were outnumbered and the war was lost. Bahadur Shah entered Chittorgarh and ransacked it for the second time.

Realizing that defeat was imminent, Karnavati and the other noble ladies of the court immolated themselves in Jauhar on March 8, 1534 A.D., while all the men donned saffron clothes and went out to fight to the death and thus committed Saka. This is the occasion for the second of the three Jauhars performed at Chittor.

Notes

References
 Medieval India: From Sultanat to the Mughals Part - II

Year of birth missing
Indian princesses
Mewar dynasty
People from Chittorgarh district
1535 deaths
People who committed sati
Indian female royalty
Indian queen consorts
16th-century Indian monarchs
16th-century women rulers
16th-century Indian women
16th-century Indian people
16th-century suicides
Rajput princesses